Sabih Azhar (born 28 February 1962 in Rawalpindi, Punjab) is a former first-class cricketer.

He played for Agriculture Development Bank of Pakistan & Rawalpindi in first-class & List A matches.

Coaching career 
Currently he is the coach of Rawalpindi Region in first-class & Rawalpindi Rams in List A & T20 matches.

 Sabih Azhar was the coach of Pakistan Under-19 in U-19 Asia Cup 2012, where Pakistan Under-19 shared the title with India Under-19 after the TIE in the Final.
 Sabih Azhar was the coach of Pakistan Under-19 in U-19 World Cup 2012, where Pakistan Under-19 ended the tournament at No.8.
 Sabih Azhar was the coach of Pakistan Under-25 in 2012 SAARC T20 Cup, where Pakistan ended as the Champion.
 Sabih Azhar is currently coaching the women's cricket team of Pakistan

Achievements as Coach of Rawalpindi 
 Super-8 T20 Cup 2011 - Winners
 Quaid-e-Azam Trophy 2013–14 - Winners

References
Cricinfo article on Sabih Azhar

Notes

1962 births
Living people
Pakistani cricketers
Rawalpindi cricketers
Zarai Taraqiati Bank Limited cricketers
Pakistani cricket coaches